Alcadia maxima is a species of tropical and subtropical land snails with an operculum, terrestrial gastropod mollusks in the family Helicinidae.

References 

Helicinidae
Gastropods described in 1842